Harold Leo Friedman (born 24 March 1923 in Manhattan, New York City; died 16 September 2005 in Stony Brook, Long Island, New York) was an American physical chemist who contributed to the study of thermodynamic properties of fluids with applications in oceanography and physiology. 

He received his undergraduate degree and Ph.D in chemistry from the University of Chicago.

He taught at the University of Southern California and worked for I.B.M.'s research center in Yorktown Heights, N.Y before moving to teach at Stony Brook University in 1965. He was chairman of Stony Brook's chemistry department during the 1970s, retiring as a professor emeritus in 1994.

In 1987 he was elected a Fellow of the American Physical Society "for pioneering work in the theory of the statistical mechanics of ionic solutions and in the application of the theory of experimental observables".  In 1988, he was awarded the Robinson Medal of the Royal Society of Chemistry's Faraday Division.

Works 
 Ionic Solution Theory, ,1962
 A Course In Statistical Mechanics, 1988

External links 
 Stony Brook Chemistry page
 THE NEW YORK TIMES: Harold Friedman, 82, Chemist Who Studied Electrolytes (24. September 2005)
 Journal articles

References

20th-century American chemists
1923 births
2005 deaths
People from Manhattan
University of Chicago alumni
Stony Brook University faculty
Fellows of the American Physical Society